Žarko Galjanić (born 12 October 1978) is a Croatian biathlete. He competed in the men's 20 km individual event at the 2002 Winter Olympics.

References

1978 births
Living people
Croatian male biathletes
Olympic biathletes of Croatia
Biathletes at the 2002 Winter Olympics
Sportspeople from Rijeka